Christabel Ekeh (born October 16, 1990) is a Ghanaian actress and model. She has been featured in more than eighty Ghanaian and Nigerian movies.

Career
Ekeh started her career as a model and participated at the beauty pageant, Miss Malaika Ghana 2008 and won the second position.

Her acting career began when she featured in the Nigerian movie College Girls

She is also known for the movie Potomanto

Filmography

College Girls (2008)
Potomanto (2013)
Stalemate (2016)
Sidechic Gang (2018)
Peep
State of Emergency
Ladies with Wings
Waist Beads
Corporate Love
Wrong Target
Beautiful Ruins
14 February
War Against Women

References

Living people
University of Ghana alumni
Ghanaian film actresses
St Mary's Senior High School (Ghana) alumni
1990 births